These are the official results of the Women's 800 metres event at the 1980 Summer Olympics in Moscow. The competition was held on July 24, 1980, and on July 27, 1980.

Final
Held on Sunday July 27, 1980

Semifinals
Held on Friday July 25, 1980

Heats
Held on Thursday July 24, 1980

References

External links
Results

 8
800 metres at the Olympics
1980 in women's athletics
Women's events at the 1980 Summer Olympics